DXKI may refer to:
 DXKI-AM, an AM radio station broadcasting in Koronadal
 DXKI-FM, an FM radio station broadcasting in Cagayan De Oro, branded as Strong Radio